Kharabeh-ye Senji (also Romanized as Kharābeh-ye Senjī; also known as Kharābeh) is a village in Nazluchay Rural District, Nazlu District, Urmia County, West Azerbaijan Province, Iran. At the 2006 census, its population was 681, in 95 families.

References 

Populated places in Urmia County